At the 2011 Pan Arab Games, the taekwondo events were held at Qatar Sports Club in Doha, Qatar from 14–17 December. A total of 16 events were contested.

Medal summary

Men

Women

Medal table

References

External links
Taekwondo at official website

2011 in taekwondo
Events at the 2011 Pan Arab Games
2011 Pan Arab Games
2011 Pan Arab Games